Saint-Joseph-de-Lepage is a parish municipality in La Mitis Regional County Municipality in the Bas-Saint-Laurent region of Quebec, Canada.

It is located 5 km south-east of Mont-Joli in the Matapédia River Valley. The village is 350 km north east of Québec city and 360 km west of Gaspé. The nearest towns are Mont-Joli, and Rimouski which lies 40 km to the south-east.

Saint-Joseph-de-Lepage takes its name from the colonial lordship, the Seigneurie Lepage-et-Thibierge, which was the early governance of the area. Its 500 residents work largely in agriculture and forestry.

The ecclesiastical parish of the same name is in the Archdiocese of Rimouski.

Demographics 

Population trend:
Population in 2021: 590 (12.8% increase from 2016)
Population in 2016: 523 (0.8% decrease from 2011)
Population in 2011: 527 (3.3% decrease from 2006)
Population in 2006: 545 (7.0% decrease from 2001)
Population in 2001: 586
Population in 1996: 613

Private dwellings (occupied by usual residents): 223

Languages:
French as first language: 98.3%

See also
 List of parish municipalities in Quebec

References

External links
 

Parish municipalities in Quebec
Incorporated places in Bas-Saint-Laurent